The Lewis Tower House is an historic house in Cumberland, Rhode Island.

Built c. 1825, it is a Federal style house that is two-and-one-half-stories with a flank gable roof and an L-plan. The house is set into a small hill and has a one-and-one half-story, gabled ell at the rear. An original, two-story, hip-roof veranda extends across the front; its second story level continues along the side and ell. The veranda roof slope is integral with those of the main house and ell. There is a central entrance on each story in the five-bay facade beneath the veranda; the second-story entrance has sidelights and decorative trim. The house was probably standing when Lewis Tower purchased a 19-acre farmstead here from Philip Thomas in 1833.

The house was added to the National Register of Historic Places in 1982.

See also
National Register of Historic Places listings in Providence County, Rhode Island

References

Houses completed in 1825
Houses on the National Register of Historic Places in Rhode Island
Houses in Cumberland, Rhode Island
National Register of Historic Places in Providence County, Rhode Island
Federal architecture in Rhode Island